Coliloquy is a digital publishing house based in San Francisco, which specializes in interactive fiction. Lisa Rutherford and Waynn Lue co-founded the startup in January 2012. Coliloquy has published books from over 40 authors, among them Stephen King, Amy Tan, and Matt Groening.

In 2014 Coliloquy was acquired by Vook, a multimedia book publisher. Vook itself changed its business strategy in 2015 and rebranded itself as Pronoun.

Notable Features 
Coliloquy was the second ebook publisher to develop Active Content for the Amazon Kindle. By engaging with specific features of book applications, readers can control the outcome of the narrative. Some titles provide the reader with choice points within the story, allowing the reader to pick path A or B.
Other books allow for readers to participate in the writing of a book.

Titles 
Most Coliloquy titles are classified as Young Adult, Young Adult Romance, Romance, or Erotica

Entwined by Joy Daniels, Debra Hyde, A.Devlin, Lissa Trevor
Fluid by Travis Sentell
Georgetown Academy by Alyssa Embree Schwartz & Jessica Koosed Etting
Great Escapes by Lynda Scott & Linda Wisdom
Hard Listening by Stephen King, Scott Turow, Amy Tan, Dave Barry, Roy Blount, Jr., Mitch Albom, James McBride, Ridley Pearson, Matt Groening, Greg Iles, Sam Barry, Roger McGuinn
Kingdom Keepers Insider by Ridley Pearson
King Solomon's Wives series by Holly McDowell
Outer Banks Tennis Academy by Jennifer Iacopelli
Spellspinners of Melas County by Heidi R. Kling
Shultz Sisters Mysteries by Tawna Fenske
The Parish Mail Series by Kira Snyder
Totlandia by Josie Brown

Children's Books
A Dark & Dismal Flower by J.C. Herz and Eve Scott. Illustrations by Shamona Stokes and animation by Alex Scott

References 

Companies based in California
Publishing companies of the United States
2012 establishments in California